Pietro Lando was the Doge of Venice from 1538 to 1545.
 

He had a distinguished career as Captain General of the Sea, but was forced to sign a humiliating peace treaty with Suleiman I in 1540, ceding Venice's last possessions in the Peloponnese to the Ottoman Empire. He was married to Maria Pasqualigo.

References

Republic of Venice admirals
1545 deaths
Year of birth unknown
Republic of Venice people of the Ottoman–Venetian Wars
16th-century Doges of Venice
Procurators of Saint Mark